Rafalus is a genus of jumping spiders that was first described by Jerzy Prószyński in 1999.

Species
 it contains twelve species, found only in Africa and Asia:
Rafalus arabicus Wesolowska & van Harten, 2010 – United Arab Emirates
Rafalus christophori Prószyński, 1999 (type) – Egypt, Israel
Rafalus desertus Wesolowska & van Harten, 2010 – United Arab Emirates
Rafalus feliksi Prószyński, 1999 – Egypt, United Arab Emirates
Rafalus insignipalpis (Simon, 1882) – Yemen (mainland, Socotra)
Rafalus karskii Prószyński, 1999 – Israel
Rafalus lymphus (Próchniewicz & Hęciak, 1994) – Kenya, Tanzania, Ethiopia, Yemen
Rafalus minimus Wesolowska & van Harten, 2010 – United Arab Emirates
Rafalus nigritibiis (Caporiacco, 1941) – Ethiopia
Rafalus stanislawi Prószyński, 1999 – Israel
Rafalus variegatus (Kroneberg, 1875) – Iran, Central Asia
Rafalus wittmeri (Prószyński, 1978) – Bhutan

References

External links
 Photograph of R. insignipalpis

Invertebrates of the Middle East
Salticidae
Salticidae genera
Spiders of Africa
Spiders of Asia